An environment artist is a professional artist who works in the video game industry or film industry as a 3D modeler, specializing in outdoor and indoor locations for a game's setting. They are responsible for creating the majority of the overall asset and visuals the player will encounter on the screen, modelling, texturing and placing assets, buildings, streets, foliage, furniture and all other elements into a scene using a method called set dressing. They
also approximate collision so that the player isn't running through walls or other objects that block, optimize topology so that the level runs at a manageable framerate, and help bring life to the game world. Environment art has become an increasingly desired field of work since the rise of console gaming. With more technology comes better environments. There is usually direct correlation between time and quality of environment art.

References 

Video game design